This page details statistics, records, and other achievements pertaining to Tiger Woods.

Career records and statistics
 Woods has won 82 official PGA Tour events, tied with Sam Snead also 82, and nine ahead of  Jack Nicklaus's 73 wins. (See List of golfers with most PGA Tour wins.)
 Woods has won 15 majors, second all time behind Jack Nicklaus' 18.
 Woods is 14–1 when going into the final round of a major with at least a share of the lead.
 Woods scoring average in 2000 is the lowest in PGA Tour history, both adjusted, 67.79, and unadjusted, 68.17.
 Woods has the lowest career scoring average in PGA Tour history.
 Woods has amassed the most career earnings of any player in PGA Tour history (even after inflation is considered).
 Woods is one of five players (along with Gene Sarazen, Ben Hogan, Gary Player, and Jack Nicklaus) to have won all four professional major championships in his career, known as the Career Grand Slam, and was the youngest to do so.
 Woods is the only player to have won all four professional major championships in a row, accomplishing the feat in the 2000–2001 seasons. This feat became known as the "Tiger Slam".
 Woods set the all-time PGA Tour record for most consecutive cuts made, with 142. The streak started in 1998, he set the record at the 2003 Tour Championship with 114 (passing Byron Nelson's previous record of 113 and Jack Nicklaus at 105) and extended this mark to 142 before it ended on May 13, 2005 at the EDS Byron Nelson Championship. Many consider this to be one of the most remarkable golf accomplishments of all time, given the margin by which he broke the old record and given that during the streak, the next longest streak by any other player was usually only in the 10s or 20s. When Byron Nelson played far fewer players made the cut in a given event.
 Woods has won a record 22.8% (82 out of 359) of his professional starts on the PGA Tour.
 Woods is the only golfer to have won the U.S. Amateur three consecutive times (1994–1996).

Awards records
 Woods has been the PGA Player of the Year a record eleven times.
 Woods has been the PGA Tour Player of the Year a record eleven times.
 Woods has been the PGA Tour Money Leader a record ten times.
 Woods has been the Vardon Trophy winner a record nine times.
 Woods has been the recipient of the Byron Nelson Award a record nine times.

Miscellaneous
 Woods owns a 55–4 record when holding at least a share of the lead after 54 holes, and 44–2 record when holding the outright lead.
 Woods has only lost once when leading by more than one shot after 54 holes. Yang Yong-eun began the final round of the 2009 PGA Championship two strokes behind Woods and defeated him by three strokes.
 Woods has a 39–11 record when leading after 36 holes in Tour events, including an 8–3 record in majors.
 Woods has won 14 tournaments wire-to-wire, including seven times while holding the lead outright after each round: 2000 U.S. Open, 2000 PGA Championship (tied after 1st and 4th rounds), 2000 WGC-NEC Invitational, 2002 Bay Hill Invitational (tied after 1st round), 2002 U.S. Open, 2002 WGC-American Express Championship, 2003 Western Open, 2005 Open Championship, 2005 WGC-NEC Invitational (tied after 1st, 2nd and 3rd rounds), 2006 Ford Championship at Doral (tied after 2nd round), 2006 WGC-American Express Championship, 2013 WGC-Cadillac Championship (tied after 1st round), 2018 Tour Championship  (tied after 1st and 2nd rounds), 2019 Zozo Championship (tied after 1st round)
 Woods has successfully defended a title 24 times on the PGA Tour
 Woods has finished runner-up 31 times, and in third place 19 times.
 Woods has spent the most consecutive and cumulative weeks atop the world rankings.
 Woods holds the PGA Tour record for most consecutive rounds at par or better with 52. The streak began in the second round of the 2000 GTE Byron Nelson Classic and ended in the second round of the 2001 Phoenix Open. When including non-PGA Tour events, the streak was 66.
 Woods' win at the 2005 Open Championship made him only the second golfer (after Nicklaus) to have won all four majors more than once. With his win in the 2008 U.S. Open, Woods joined Nicklaus as the only golfers to win each major at least three times. 
 Woods' victory at the 2006 WGC-American Express Championship, he became the first player in PGA Tour history to win at least eight times in three different seasons. 
 Woods' victory in the Buick Invitational in January 2007 placed him 2nd for the longest PGA Tour win streak at 7 (consecutive wins in PGA events entered), trailing only Nelson's streak of 11 wins in 1945.
 Woods became the first golfer to win five PGA Tour events five or more times at the 2009 BMW Championship. In order of his accomplishment: WGC-CA Championship, WGC-Bridgestone Invitational, Buick Invitational, Arnold Palmer Invitational, and BMW Championship. 
 Woods' win at the U.S. Open in 2008 made him the sixth person to win the U.S. Open three or more times, the first person to win a PGA Tour tournament on the same course seven times, and the first person to win two tournaments at the same golf course in the same season.
 Woods has hit a hole-in-one 20 times in the course of his lifetime, his first at the age of six. Three have come in PGA Tour competitions - at the 1996 Greater Milwaukee Open, 1997 Phoenix Open, and 1998 Sprint International.
Woods is the only professional golfer to win four majors in a row.
Woods finally came from behind in a major championship to win the 2019 Masters.
At the 2002 Mercedes Championships at the Plantation Course at the Kapalua Resort in Hawaii, Woods hit a 498-yard drive on the par-5 18th. That shot is the longest drive in the history of the PGA Tour recorded by ShotLink, the PGA Tour's data gathering information system.

Major championships

Wins (15)

Results timeline
Results not in chronological order in 2020.

LA = Low amateur
CUT = missed the half-way cut
WD = withdrew
"T" indicates a tie for a place.
NT = No tournament due to COVID-19 pandemic

Summary

Most consecutive cuts made – 39 (1996 U.S. Open – 2006 Masters)
Longest streak of top-10s – 8 (1999 U.S. Open – 2001 Masters)

Records and trivia
In all of his major victories, he has had the outright lead or a share of the lead at the end of the third round, except his victory at the 2019 Masters. He has had the outright lead or a share of the lead 11 times at the end of the second round and has only lost three times.
Woods holds at least a share of the record for lowest 72-hole score in relation to par in one of the four majors. Note that the 'to par' and 'low 72-holes' records are not always the same because, while most championship golf courses have a par of 72, or 288 for four rounds, some have a par of 71 or 70.
Woods is the only player to have won multiple professional majors in consecutive years, 2005 and 2006.
Woods has won two or more majors in a year four times. He trails only Jack Nicklaus, who won two majors in a season five times (1963, '66, '72, '75 and '80).
Woods, Nicklaus, Jordan Spieth, Brooks Koepka and Rickie Fowler are the only players to have finished in the top 5 in all four majors in a year. Woods and Nicklaus have both achieved this twice: Woods in 2000 and 2005, and Nicklaus in 1971 and 1973. Fowler joined the list in 2014, Spieth joined in 2015, and Koepka joined in 2019.
Woods and Bobby Jones are the only golfers to have won 10 majors before the age of 30. Jones achieved 13 majors in 21 attempts, (winning percentage 62%), while Woods achieved 10 wins in 44 attempts (a 23% winning ratio).
Woods is only the second player all-time to win three major championships in a calendar year (2000) winning the U.S. Open, The Open Championship, and the PGA Championship respectively, along with Ben Hogan who accomplished this feat in (1953) with The Masters, the U.S. Open, and The Open Championships.
Woods is the second player to have won the career grand slam three times along with Jack Nicklaus. Woods is the only professional golfer to win four majors in a row.

Masters Tournament
In 1997 Woods set records for the lowest aggregate and to-par score with 270 strokes (18 under par); the record was tied by Jordan Spieth in 2015 and broken by Dustin Johnson in 2020, who finished with 268 strokes (20 under par).
Woods holds the record for the largest margin of victory at the Masters: 12 strokes (1997)
Woods became the youngest winner in 1997 at the age of 21 years, 104 days; in 2019 he became the second oldest player to win the Masters at 43 years old.
His win made him the first winner of The Masters, or any other (under-50) men's major, of African or Asian descent.
After a front-nine 40 in the first round (four over par), Woods played the final 63 holes 22-under par (1997)
He played 72 holes without a single three-putt
During his 2005 win, Woods set a record with the lowest back-to-back total for two rounds: 131 (65-66). The record was broken by Jordan Spieth (64-66) in 2015.

U.S. Open
Woods holds the record for the largest margin of victory at the U.S. Open based on 72 holes (no playoffs): 15 strokes (2000). (In 1929, Bobby Jones had a margin of victory of 23 strokes, but that tournament was played over 108 holes, as a 36-hole playoff was played as he and Al Espinosa were tied;  Jones (141) defeated Espinosa (164) in the playoff.)
Also in 2000, Woods became the first player to finish a U.S. Open at double digits under par. (In 1992, Gil Morgan was the first ever to be double digits under par at any stage of a U.S. Open, but failed to finish in double digits under par, and indeed failed to win that event, with Tom Kite winning instead.)
Woods was the only player to finish under par at the following U.S. Opens:
2000 at Pebble Beach Golf Links: -12
2002 at Bethpage State Park, Black Course: -3
With his win in 2008, Woods equaled Jack Nicklaus' feat of winning each major at least three times.
The 2008 win is the final U.S. Open to play more than 90 holes (91), as subsequent playoffs are now only two holes.

The Open Championship
Woods shares the record for largest margin of victory at a post-1900 Open Championship: 8 strokes (2000)
Woods became the fifth player to achieve the Career Grand Slam, and the youngest player to do so, breaking the mark held by Nicklaus (26 years, 6 months at the 1966 Open)
He became the fastest to win all four majors – in his 93rd sanctioned tournament, compared with 125 for Nicklaus
He became the youngest to win a fourth major championship, breaking the mark held by Nicklaus ( at the 1965 Masters)
In 2006, Woods became the first player to win the Open Championship in back-to-back years since Tom Watson in 1982/1983
He became the first golfer since Watson in 1982 to win the U.S. Open and Open Championship in the same year

PGA Championship
With his 2006 PGA Championship win, Woods became the only golfer to have won all 4 majors by at least 5 strokes
Woods was the only player in the stroke-play era (since 1958) to repeat as PGA champion until Brooks Koepka equaled this feat in 2019.
Woods' wins at Medinah in 1999 and 2006 make him the only player to win the PGA Championship twice on the same course.
Woods’ second round 63 in the 2007 PGA Championship tied the record for second lowest single-round score in major championship history
Woods is the only player to win the PGA Championship back-to-back on two different occasions: 1999–2000 and 2006–2007.

The Players Championship

Wins (2)

Results timeline

WD = withdrew
"T" indicates a tie for a place.

World Golf Championships

Wins (18)

Results timeline
Results not in chronological order before 2015.

1Cancelled due to 9/11

QF, R16, R32, R64 = Round in which player lost in match play
"T" indicates a tie for a place.
NT = No Tournament
WD = Withdrew
Note that the HSBC Champions did not become a WGC event until 2009.

Performance summary

Records
Won at least one World Golf Championships event every year from 1999 to 2009.
All-time wins leader in World Golf Championships events (39.1% win rate).
All-time money leader in World Golf Championships events.
Won the WGC-World Cup with David Duval in 2000, an unofficial money WGC event, for a total of 19 World Golf Championships titles.
Only player to have held the titles of all three of the pre-2009 events (not counting the HSBC Champions, elevated to WGC status in 2009) at the same time.

Match Play
Woods set the record for most lopsided victory (18-hole match) in his first round match against Stephen Ames in 2006 – 9 & 8. Mathematically, it is the fastest possible win in 18-hole match play (10 & 8 would be a larger margin of victory, but the same number of holes played).
Woods also set the record for largest margin of victory in the 36-hole final match – 8 & 7 over Stewart Cink in 2008.

Championship
Lowest first 18-hole total 63 set the course record at The Grove 
Tied lowest first 18-hole total – 63 
Lowest 36-hole total – 127 
Largest 36-hole lead – 5 strokes 
Lowest 54-hole total – 194 
Largest 54-hole lead – 6 strokes 
Lowest 72-hole total – 261 
Largest margin of victory – 8 strokes 
Only player to record top-10 finishes in each appearance (more than two appearances)
Note: All Cadillac Championship records were set in 2006, when the tournament was known as the American Express Championship

Invitational 
Lowest 18-hole total – 61 (twice, tied with José María Olazábal)
Lowest 36-hole total – 125 
Lowest 54-hole total – 192 
Lowest 72-hole total – 259 
Largest margin of victory – 11 strokes
Note: All records were set in 2000 and 2013 (18-hole record)

FedEx Cup Playoffs

PGA Tour professional career summary

Green background for 1st place. Yellow background for top 10.
* Woods qualified for the third round in the 1998 AT&T Pebble Beach National Pro-Am but decided to withdraw from the rain-delayed event. Officially, it is counted as a missed cut.
† Woods did not play the required 50 rounds to be ranked in scoring average these years: 1996 – 41 rounds, 2008 – 26, 2010 – 45, 2011 – 27, 2014 – 21, 2015 – 32, 2017 – 2, 2019 − 42, 2020 – 28, 2021 – 10.
Woods played in 14 PGA Tour events from 1992 to 1996 as an amateur. In this span, he made 5 cuts, with his best finish and sole top-25 performance coming at the 1996 British Open. This brings his total tally of PGA Tour events played to 369, his total number of cuts made to 334, and his total number of top-25 finishes to 270.
**As of February 19, 2023

Professional wins (110)

PGA Tour wins (82)

*Note: The 1997 Mercedes Championships was shortened to 54 holes due to rain.
1Co-sanctioned by the Japan Golf Tour

PGA Tour playoff record (11–1)

European Tour wins (41)

1Co-sanctioned by the PGA Tour of Australasia
2Co-sanctioned by the Asian Tour

European Tour playoff record (10–0)

Note: This table is the European Tour's official Woods' victories on their tour, which gives Woods a total of 41 European Tour wins.
Woods' worldwide tournament playoff record is 16–6.

Japan Golf Tour wins (3)

1Co-sanctioned by the PGA Tour

Japan Golf Tour playoff record (1–1)

Asian Tour wins (2)

1Co-sanctioned by the European Tour and the PGA Tour of Australasia

PGA Tour of Australasia wins (3)

1Co-sanctioned by the European Tour
2Co-sanctioned by the Asian Tour

PGA Tour of Australasia playoff record (1–0)

Other wins (17)Other playoff record (1–4)Amateur wins (21)
1984 (1) Junior World Golf Championships (Boys 10-and-under)
1985 (1) Junior World Golf Championships (Boys 10-and-under)
1988 (1) Junior World Golf Championships (Boys 11–12)
1989 (1) Junior World Golf Championships (Boys 13–14)
1990 (2) Junior World Golf Championships (Boys 13–14), Insurance Youth Golf Classic
1991 (3) U.S. Junior Amateur, Junior World Golf Championships (Boys 15–17), Orange Bowl International Junior
1992 (2) U.S. Junior Amateur, Insurance Youth Golf Classic
1993 (1) U.S. Junior Amateur
1994 (3) U.S. Amateur, Western Amateur, Pacific Northwest Amateur
1995 (2) U.S. Amateur, College All-America Golf Classic
1996 (4) U.S. Amateur, NCAA Division I Championship, NCAA West Regional, Pac-10 Championship

Amateur major wins (3)

Results timeline

M = Medalist
DNQ = Did not qualify for match play portion
R32, R16, QF, SF = Round in which player lost in match play
Green background for wins. Yellow background for top-10

Source:

Reign as World No. 1 male golfer
Woods holds the record for most consecutive weeks at No. 1, 281, and the most total number of weeks, 683. Since 1997, he has spent over twelve years atop the Official World Golf Ranking, and has been the number one player for all 52 weeks of a year a record eight times – 2000, 2001, 2002, 2003, 2006, 2007, 2008 and 2009. He has spent 861 weeks ranked in the top-10, and overtook Ernie Els as the golfer with the most weeks ranked in the top 10 in 2013.

This list is complete as of May 18, 2014.

U.S. national team appearancesAmateurEisenhower Trophy: 1994 (winners)
Walker Cup: 1995ProfessionalRyder Cup: 1997, 1999 (winners), 2002, 2004, 2006, 2010, 2012, 2018
Ryder Cup record (W–L–H): 13–21–3
Alfred Dunhill Cup: 1998
Presidents Cup: 1998, 2000 (winners), 2003 (tie), 2005 (winners), 2007 (winners), 2009 (winners), 2011 (winners), 2013 (winners), 2019 (playing captain, winners)
Presidents Cup record (W–L–H): 27–15–1
World Cup: 1999 (winners, individual winner), 2000 (winners), 2001

Awards1990
1st Team – Rolex Junior All-American
Southern California Player of the Year

1991
1st Team – Rolex Junior All-American  (2) 
American Junior Golf Association Player of the Year
Golf Digest Amateur Player of the Year
GolfWeek National Amateur of the Year
Southern California Player of the Year  (2) 

1992
1st Team – Rolex Junior All-American  (3) 
American Junior Golf Association Player of the Year  (2) 
Golf Digest Amateur Player of the Year  (2)
GolfWeek National Amateur of the Year  (2)
Southern California Player of the Year  (3)
Golf World Player of the Year

1993
1st Team – Rolex Junior All-American  (4)
Southern California Player of the Year  (4)
Golf World Player of the Year  (2)

1994
Golf World Man of the Year
L.A. Times Player of the Year
Orange County Player of the Year

1995
Pac-10 Player of the Year
NCAA First Team All-American
GolfWeek Preseason First Team All-American for 1995–96
Stanford University's Male Freshman of the Year

1996
PGA Tour Rookie of the Year
Sports Illustrated "Sportsman of the Year"
Stanford University Collegiate Player of the Year
Fred Haskins Award
Jack Nicklaus Award

1997
Jack Nicklaus Trophy
PGA Player of the Year 
PGA Tour Money Leader
ABC's Wide World of Sports Athlete of the Year 
Golf Writers Association of America Player of the Year 
Associated Press Male Athlete of the Year

1998
Mark H. McCormack Award
ESPNs ESPY Award for Best Male Athlete (for 1997)1999PGA Tour Player of the Year  (2) 
PGA Player of the Year  (2)
PGA Tour Money Leader  (2)
Vardon Trophy
Byron Nelson Award
Mark H. McCormack Award  (2)
Golf Writers Association of America Player of the Year  (2) 
Anderson Consulting Medal for best performance in WGC events
Associated Press Male Athlete of the Year  (2)2000'''
PGA Tour Player of the Year  (3)
PGA Player of the Year  (3)
PGA Tour Money Leader  (3)
Vardon Trophy  (2)
Byron Nelson Award  (2)
Mark H. McCormack Award  (3)
Laureus World Sports Awards (for 1999)Sports Illustrated "Sportsman of the Year"  (2)
ABC's Wide World of Sports Athlete of the Year  (2)Golf Writers Association of America Player of the Year  (3) 
Royal Canadian Golf Association Triple Crown Trophy 
Palm Performance Award as leading money winner on PGA Tour West Coast Swing
PricewaterhouseCoopers Fall Finish Award as leading money winner on PGA Tour's fall schedule
Anderson Consulting Medal for best performance in WGC events  (2)
Associated Press Male Athlete of the Year  (3)
BBC Sports Personality of the Year Overseas PersonalityESPNs ESPY Award for Best Male Athlete (for 1999)  (2)2001PGA Tour Player of the Year  (4)
PGA Player of the Year  (4)
PGA Tour Money Leader  (4)
Vardon Trophy  (3)
Byron Nelson Award  (3)
Mark H. McCormack Award  (4)
Laureus World Sports Awards (for 2000)  (2)
ESPNs ESPY Award for Best Male Athlete (for 2000)  (3)
Golf Writers Association of America Player of the Year  (4) 2002'''
PGA Tour Player of the Year  (5)
PGA Player of the Year  (5)
PGA Tour Money Leader  (5)
Vardon Trophy  (4)
Byron Nelson Award  (4)
Mark H. McCormack Award  (5)ESPNs ESPY Award for Best Male Athlete (for 2001)  (4)
Golf Writers Association of America Player of the Year  (5) 

2003
PGA Tour Player of the Year  (6)
PGA Player of the Year  (6)
Vardon Trophy  (5)
Byron Nelson Award  (5)
Mark H. McCormack Award  (6)
Golf Writers Association of America Player of the Year  (6) 

2004
Mark H. McCormack Award  (7)

2005
PGA Tour Player of the Year  (7)
PGA Player of the Year  (7)
PGA Tour Money Leader  (6)
Vardon Trophy  (6)
Byron Nelson Award  (6)
Mark H. McCormack Award  (8)
Golf Writers Association of America Player of the Year  (7) 

2006
PGA Tour Player of the Year  (8)
PGA Player of the Year  (8)
PGA Tour Money Leader  (7)
Byron Nelson Award  (7)
Mark H. McCormack Award  (9)
Associated Press Male Athlete of the Year  (4)
Golf Writers Association of America Player of the Year  (8) 

2007
PGA Tour Player of the Year  (9)
PGA Player of the Year  (9)
PGA Tour Money Leader  (8)
Vardon Trophy  (7)
Byron Nelson Award  (8)
Mark H. McCormack Award  (10)
FedEx Cup
Golf Writers Association of America Player of the Year  (9) 

2008
Mark H. McCormack Award  (11)

2009
PGA Tour Player of the Year  (10)
PGA Player of the Year  (10)
PGA Tour Money Leader  (9)
Vardon Trophy  (8)
Byron Nelson Award  (9)
Mark H. McCormack Award  (12)
FedEx Cup (2) 
Golf Writers Association of America Player of the Year  (10) 
Associated Press Athlete of the Decade

2010
Mark H. McCormack Award  (13)

2013
PGA Tour Player of the Year  (11)
PGA Player of the Year  (11)
PGA Tour Money Leader  (10)
Vardon Trophy  (9)
Mark H. McCormack Award  (14)

2019
Golf Writers Association of America Ben Hogan Award
Presidential Medal of Freedom
Teen Choice Award

References

External links

Woods, Tiger
Tiger Woods